Twice Born Men is an album by English experimental rock band Sweet Billy Pilgrim. It was shortlisted for the 2009 Mercury Prize, and the Sunday Times named it one of their top 100 albums of 2009.

Track listing
 "Here It Begins" (2:36)
 "Truth Only Smiles" (5:05)
 "Bloodless Coup" (5:43)
 "Longshore Drift" (5:01)
 "Kalypso" (6:30)
 "Future Perfect Tense" (4:31)
 "Joy Maker Machinery" (6:55)
 "There Will It End" (4:40)

Personnel
Anthony Bishop - banjo, bass
Tim Elsenburg - singing, guitar, producer, mixing
Alistair Hamer - sequencing, drums
David Sylvian - artwork [Art Direction]
Chris Bigg - artwork [Design]
Tacita Dean - artwork [Drawings]
Alphonse Elsenburg - clarinet (track 2, 8)

References 

2009 albums
Sweet Billy Pilgrim albums
Samadhi Sound albums